This is a list of unsolved problems in chemistry. Problems in chemistry are considered unsolved when an expert in the field considers it unsolved or when several experts in the field disagree about a solution to a problem.

Physical chemistry problems

 Can the transition temperature of high-temperature superconductors be brought up to room temperature?

Organic chemistry problems

 What is the origin of homochirality in biomolecules?
 Why are accelerated kinetics observed for some organic reactions at the water-organic interface?
 Do replacement reactions of aryl diazonium salts (dediazotizations) predominantly undergo SN1 or a radical mechanism?

Inorganic chemistry problems

 Are there any molecules that certainly contain a phi bond?

Biochemistry problems

 Enzyme kinetics:  Why do some enzymes exhibit faster-than-diffusion kinetics?
 Protein folding problem: Is it possible to predict the secondary, tertiary and quaternary structure of a polypeptide sequence based solely on the sequence and environmental information? Inverse protein-folding problem: Is it possible to design a polypeptide sequence which will adopt a given structure under certain environmental conditions? This has been achieved for several small globular proteins in recent years. In 2020, it was announced that Google's AlphaFold, a neural network based on DeepMind artificial intelligence, is capable of predicting a protein's final shape based solely on its amino-acid chain with an accuracy of around 90% on a test sample of proteins used by the team.
 RNA folding problem:  Is it possible to accurately predict the secondary, tertiary and quaternary structure of a polyribonucleic acid sequence based on its sequence and environment?
 Protein design:  Is it possible to design highly active enzymes de novo for any desired reaction?
 Biosynthesis:  Can desired molecules, natural products or otherwise, be produced in high yield through biosynthetic pathway manipulation?

References

External links

Unsolved Problems in Nanotechnology: Chemical Processing by Self-Assembly - Matthew Tirrell - Departments of Chemical Engineering and Materials, Materials Research Laboratory, California NanoSystems Institute, University of California, Santa Barbara [No doc at link, 20 Aug 2016]

Unsolved problems
chemistry
Scientific problems